Njutånger is a locality situated in Hudiksvall Municipality, Gävleborg County, Sweden with 885 inhabitants in 2010.

References 

Populated places in Hudiksvall Municipality
Hälsingland